The 2010 Ethias Trophy was a professional tennis tournament played on indoor hard courts. It was the sixth edition of the tournament which was part of the Tretorn SERIE+ of the 2010 ATP Challenger Tour. It took place in Mons, Belgium between 4 and 11 October 2010.

Singles main-draw entrants

Seeds

 Rankings are as of September 27, 2010.

Other entrants
The following players received wildcards into the singles main draw:
  Ruben Bemelmans
  David Goffin
  Christophe Rochus
  Kristof Vliegen

The following players received entry from the qualifying draw:
  Brian Battistone
  Adrien Bossel
  Yannick Mertens
  Martin Slanar
  Marc Gicquel (Lucky loser replacing Xavier Malisse)

Champions

Singles

 Adrian Mannarino def.  Steve Darcis, 7–5, 6–2

Doubles

 Filip Polášek /  Igor Zelenay def.  Ruben Bemelmans /  Yannick Mertens, 3–6, 6–4, [10–5]

External links
Official website
ITF Search 
ATP official site

 
Ethias Trophy
Ethias
Ethias Trophy